Stéphane Picq (born 16 August 1965) is a French composer of video game music, primarily for ERE Informatique/Exxos and Cryo Interactive.

History
Picq first began composing in 1987. He retired from the industry in 1998 and moved to Madagascar. In February 2006, he announced that he was building a new studio in Madagascar and may release a compilation of old songs.

On 13 November 2015 ZOOM Platform and the Jordan Freeman Group revealed that Stéphane Picq, original musical composer for MegaRace 1, had joined the MegaRace Reboot Team and would be composing the soundtrack with other team members, including Jordan Freeman and Max Petrosky, along with some special guests. The news had actually broken on the previous day, 12 November 2015, via the MegaRace Reboot's official Facebook page.

On 22 August 2016 ZOOM Platform and the Jordan Freeman Group released Stéphane Picq's complete MegaRace 1 soundtrack re-mastered in stereo for the first time ever on various digital download services including Amazon MP3, CDBaby, Google Play, and iTunes.

In an interview in July 2020, he looks back on his career and in particular on the reasons that led him to leave the video game industry. The composer explains that the lack of artistic freedom made him tired.

Musical style
Picq claims to own dozens of instruments from all over the world and the ability to play all of them. His musical style incorporates "organic sonority", as he features many "organic sounds" such as breaths, water, sighs. The most representative examples are found in "Dune: Spice Opera", but this technique is also used on other Cryo soundtracks (for example, "Thaa's Secret" in Lost Eden).

Selected works
Extase
KULT: The Temple of Flying Saucers
KGB
"Dune: Spice Opera" (the soundtrack to the game Dune)
MegaRace
Commander Blood
Dragon Lore
Lost Eden
Atlantis: The Lost Tales
Riverworld

References

External links
Artist profile at OverClocked ReMix

1965 births
French composers
French electronic musicians
French emigrants to Madagascar
French male composers
French techno musicians
Living people
Video game composers